Devon Howard Hall (born July 7, 1995) is an American professional basketball player for Olimpia Milano of the Italian Lega Basket Serie A (LBA) and the EuroLeague. He played college basketball for the Virginia Cavaliers.

Early life
Hall is the son of Leslie Guidry and Mark Hall and has an older brother, Mark Jr. He attended Cape Henry Collegiate School in Virginia Beach. He chose Virginia for college because of its high graduation rate for African-Americans.

College career
Hall redshirted his freshman year at Virginia, making him emotional because he wanted to be an impact player. As a redshirt freshman, Hall played 10.6 minutes per game and appeared in only 23 games. Through three seasons, Hall averaged 5.2 points per game. As a senior, he averaged 11.9 points and 4.3 rebounds per game, shooting 44.3 percent from behind the arc on a No. 1 ranked Cavaliers team. Hall scored a career-high 25 points in a 68–51 win against NC State on January 14, 2018. He was a second-team All-ACC selection in 2017–18. He participated in the 2018 Portsmouth Invitational Tournament, averaging 17.3 points, 5.7 rebounds and 3.3 assists in three games.

Professional career

Cairns Taipans (2018–2019)
Hall was selected with the 53rd overall pick in the 2018 NBA draft by the Oklahoma City Thunder. After the draft, Hall played for the Thunder in the 2018 NBA Summer League. On August 12, 2018, Hall signed with the Cairns Taipans for the 2018–19 NBL season.

Oklahoma City Blue (2019)
On February 26, 2019, Hall signed with the Oklahoma City Blue of the NBA G League. On December 16, 2019, Hall resigned with the team.

Oklahoma City Thunder (2019)
On September 4, 2019, Hall signed a two-way contract with the Oklahoma City Thunder. On December 12, 2019, the Oklahoma City Thunder announced that they had waived Hall.

Second stint with Oklahoma City Blue (2019–2020)
On December 16, 2019, Hall was acquired by the Oklahoma City Blue. On January 13, 2020, Hall tallied 26 points, seven rebounds, four assists, one steal and one block in a 118–111 loss to the Capital City Go-Go. He started 30 games, averaging 15.6 points, 5.7 rebounds, and 4.4 assists per game.

Second stint with Oklahoma City Thunder (2020)
On June 27, 2020, Hall signed with the Oklahoma City Thunder.

Brose Bamberg (2020–2021)
On October 30, 2020, Hall signed with Brose Bamberg of the Basketball Bundesliga.

Olimpia Milano (2021–present)
On June 20, 2021, Hall officially signed a two-year deal with Italian club Olimpia Milano of the Lega Basket Serie A (LBA) and the Euroleague.

Career statistics

NBA

|-
| style="text-align:left;"| 
| style="text-align:left;"| Oklahoma City
| 11 || 0 || 7.4 || .200 || .235 || .500 || .6 || 1.2 || .4 || .1 || 1.8
|- class="sortbottom"
| style="text-align:center;" colspan="2"| Career
| 11 || 0 || 7.4 || .200 || .235 || .500 || .6 || 1.2 || .4 || .1 || 1.8

College

|-
| style="text-align:left;"| 2014–15
| style="text-align:left;"| Virginia
| 23 || 1 || 10.6 || .400 || .333 || .455 || .7 || .8 || .4 || .0 || 1.8
|-
| style="text-align:left;"| 2015–16
| style="text-align:left;"| Virginia
| 37 || 20 || 21.9 || .375 || .333 || .765 || 2.6 || 2.0 || .5 || .3 || 4.4
|-
| style="text-align:left;"| 2016–17
| style="text-align:left;"| Virginia
| 34 || 34 || 27.4 || .408 || .372 || .776 || 4.4 || 1.9 || .5 || .1 || 8.4
|-
| style="text-align:left;"| 2017–18
| style="text-align:left;"| Virginia
| 34 || 34 || 32.1 || .454 || .432 || .894 || 4.2 || 3.1 || .9 || .1 || 11.7
|- class="sortbottom"
| style="text-align:center;" colspan="2"| Career
| 128 || 89 || 24.0 || .419 || .389 || .807 || 3.2 || 2.1 || .6 || .2 || 6.9

References

External links
Virginia Cavaliers bio

1995 births
Living people
21st-century African-American sportspeople
African-American basketball players
American expatriate basketball people in Australia
American expatriate basketball people in Germany
American men's basketball players
Basketball players from Virginia
Brose Bamberg players
Cairns Taipans players
Oklahoma City Blue players
Oklahoma City Thunder draft picks
Oklahoma City Thunder players
Olimpia Milano players
Shooting guards
Sportspeople from Virginia Beach, Virginia
Virginia Cavaliers men's basketball players